Möminjon Qöchqorov (born 5 November 1983), most commonly known by her stage name Mömin Rizo, is an Uzbek actor. The singer was awarded "Doʻstlik" in 2011, and "Honored Artist of Uzbekistan" in 2017.

Mömin Rizo has achieved great success in acting. Mömin Rizo  received wide recognition in Uzbekistan after his role in the 2005 Uzbek drama Super Team. Since then, he has acted in many Uzbek films. In particular, the films “Super Kamanda” and “Bahor oylarida”, which were released on the big screens in 2017, brought great fame to the actor.

Life and career

Mömin Rizo was born on November 5, 1983 in the Ferganá region, into a family of intellectuals. After graduating from high school, Mömin Rizo studied at the Kyrgyz-Uzbek International University Faculty of Law and Customs in 2001–2006.

He started his acting career in 2005 with his role in the movie “Super Kamanda”. Although this film was Mömin Rizo's first role, it received good ratings. The movie "Super Kamanda" tells the story of an ugly boy whose father abandoned him. After that, he starred in several movies. In 2019 he starred in the film "Egizak oshiqlar", produced by Ruslan Mirzayev.  The film was shot in Istanbul, Turkey, and Mömin Rizo played one of the leading roles in the film.  She then played the lead role in the series "Ishq o'yinlari" (Love Games), shot by Turkish and Uzbek filmmakers from 2020 to 2021. In 2020, he starred in the film "Khuda Haafiz" co-produced by India and Uzbekistan. Then he played the main role in the series "Yur Muhabbat" (Come on love), shot by Turkish and Uzbek filmmakers from 2022.

Personal life 
Mömin Rizo is married and has 5 children, that is, 4 daughters and a son. His wife Ziyoda Normuradova is also an actress.

Filmography 
The following is a chronologically ordered list of films that Mömin Rizo has starred in.

TV serials

Awards and nominations 

 2006 - Laureate of the XXVIII award "Choice of Favorite Actor" in the local nomination "Favorite Uzbek Actor" of the NTT TV channel of Uzbekistan.
 2007 - winner of the non-commercial award of the national cinema of Uzbekistan "M & tv" "The best Uzbek negative character of the year" - for the role of Ulugbek in the series "Spring Months" (2008).
 2017 - for playing the role of Nodyr in the television series Asira.
 2018 - nomination "Best Actor of the Battle of Hearts / Series" for the professional prize of the Association of Film and Television Producers in the field of television cinema.
 2019 - Golden Ribbon! Laureate of the national television award. In the special nomination "Bakht Kushi".

References

External links 

 

1983 births
Living people
Uzbekistani male film actors
21st-century Uzbekistani male actors